Sindhu Samaveli is a 2010 Tamil-language independent erotic thriller film written and directed by Samy. The film stars debutants Harish Kalyan, Amala Paul, and Ghajini. The music was composed by Sundar C Babu.

The film became Samy's third controversial film in succession, achieving an "A" certificate upon censor following Uyir and Mirugam. Upon release, the film met with contrasting reviews, whilst some critics refused to give the film a rating, declaring their disgust at the film's plot. The film released on 3 September 2010 and did poorly at the box office.

The lead actress, Amala Paul, was given the stage name Anaka by Samy.

Plot
Anbu (Harish Kalyan) is a brilliant student in a village school in the Kanyakumari area. His mother teaches in the same school, and his father Veerasami (Ghajini) is a CRPF soldier in Assam. His classmate Sundari (Amala Paul), who is elder to him by three years, falls for him. One day, Veerasami gets injured in a militant attack and takes voluntary retirement and comes back to the village. Veerasami dotes on his family, especially his son, but tragedy strikes as his wife dies from a snakebite. Both father and son are devastated. Anbu decides to fulfill his mother's dream of becoming a teacher. Around this time, Veerasami and other relatives pressure Anbu into marrying Sundari. The newlyweds are together for hardly a month before they are separated as Anbu has to go to the teachers' training school. Sundari is left in the house to look after her father-in-law.

Veerasami longs for a sexual companion after his wife's death and starts lusting after Sundari. Being in close quarters with Sundari and with Anbu absent, he fantasises about having sex with her. After rescuing her from a fall from a boat, he tries to have sex with the unconscious Sundari. But regaining consciousness soon, she is shocked and covers herself up. Unable to control his urge, he has sex with Sundari on the boat. After this incident, Veerasami tries to kill himself but is stopped by Sundari, stating that she also partook in the act. They ignore the incident and try to live a normal life. Veerasami starts to drink heavily and sleeps outside regularly. One day, Sundari invites him inside and provides food. This time, Sundari, aroused by the previous incident, is the first to seduce Veerasami. After having sex multiple times, the father-in-law and daughter-in-law are now comfortable with the new illicit relationship. They start going out for movies together. Sundari provides Veerasami with alcohol when he needs it, cooks food, and performs the sexual favours that he needs. In turn, Veerasami buys Sundari kinky clothes and watches her wear them.

One day Anbu returns to find learn the bitter truth. He tries to engage in sex with Sundari, but she avoids him. The father and son are now vying for the same woman. Sundari becomes heartbroken and commits suicide after reading an article written by Anbu where he mentions that he suspects a relationship between Sundari and Veerasami but hopes that Sundari remains faithful to him and that he loves her deeply. After Sundari's death, Anbu gets feeling of called under a tree where it is written camera. The scene shifts to a boat in which Anbu and his father are both drinking. The scene shifts back showing Anbu taking out the camera where a recording shows Sundari confessing it was all because his father raped her that she lost herself and had illegal relations and she does not have any quality to live with a loving Anbu and thus turns her head to a railway track where a train is running. Enraged by all this, Anbu plans to kill his father. Anbu asks his father why he did not feel wrong while lusting for Sundari, to which he replies that Sundari was very beautiful and he feels sad that he shaved his head with Anbu and it was good that his wife died earlier. He also points out that if Sundari cheated on Anbu, then what was the possibility that his wife did not cheat on him while he was serving in the military. Hearing this, Anbu gets enrages and starts stabbing the boat. The boat gets filled with water. Anbu, in his mind, tells his father that an animal like him should die and leaves him alone, who was drinking whiskey and gets inebriated. Anbu jumps out of the sinking boat and swims to shore, while the boat with the unconscious father drifts further to the sea.

Cast
 Harish Kalyan as Anbu
 Amala Paul as Sundari
 Ghajini as Veerasami
 Fahad Nasar as Anbu's schoolmate
 Ganja Karuppu

Soundtrack 
The soundtrack was composed by Sundar C Babu.

Release 
The Times of India gave the film a rating of two out of five stars and wrote that "You can only be thankful that the film is not crude. Finally, excellent camera work by Utpal V Nayanar. Art work by Thotta Tharani stands out".

References

External links 
 
 

2010 films
2010 thriller drama films
Films about adultery in India
Films based on works by Ivan Turgenev
2010s Tamil-language films
Films scored by Sundar C. Babu
2010 drama films
Indian thriller drama films